The 2001–02 Duke Blue Devils men's basketball team represented Duke University. The head coach was Mike Krzyzewski. The team played its home games in the Cameron Indoor Stadium in Durham, North Carolina, and was a member of the Atlantic Coast Conference. Duke failed to repeat and win their third title in ten years.

Player stats

Schedule and results

|-
!colspan=9 style=|Regular season

|-
!colspan=9 style=| ACC tournament

|-
!colspan=9 style=| NCAA tournament

Awards and honors
 Duke Blue Devils became the first team to be seeded #1 in the NCAA tournament for five straight seasons.
 The team finished the regular season ranked #1 in the AP Poll for the fourth straight year.
 Jason Williams was a National Player of the Year winner for the second straight year, but oddly enough didn't win ACC Player of the Year in either 2000–01 or 2001–02. Shane Battier and Joseph Forte shared the award in '01 and Maryland's Juan Dixon won it in '02.

Team players drafted into the NBA

References

External links
Statistical Database- Duke Blue Devils Basketball Statistical Database

Duke Blue Devils men's basketball seasons
Duke Blue Devils
Duke
Duke
Duke